Timothy Achille Torlot (born 17 September 1957) is a British diplomat serving as the British Ambassador to Uzbekistan since August 2019.

Education
He attended Worcester College, Oxford and gained a BA (Hons) degree in modern languages.

Diplomatic career
Tim Torlot joined the Foreign and Commonwealth Office in 1981. Following Arabic language training at the School of Oriental and African Studies in London, he was posted as Third Secretary to Muscat in 1984 and to Wellington as Second Secretary in 1987. Returning to the FCO in 1992, he served in Personnel Management Department until 1995 and in South East Asian Department until 1997. He was posted to Santiago from 1997 to 2001. He spent a year in the FCO's Counter Terrorism Department before being appointed Director, Advanced Technologies, UK Trade & Investment. From 2005 to 2006, he was Deputy Head of Mission in Baghdad. Two short assignments at the FCO followed before he was appointed Ambassador to the Republic of Yemen in July 2007. On 26 April 2010, Timothy Torlot survived a suicide bomber's attack, responsibility for which was claimed by Al-Qaeda's Yemen wing.  He was appointed head of the European External Action Service delegation to Bolivia in 2012. He was appointed British Ambassador to Uzbekistan in 2019.

Family
Timothy Torlot married Bridie Morton in 1986. They have one daughter (Eleanor, born 1990). Their marriage was dissolved in 2011. Tim is now married to author and journalist Jennifer Steil (they married in 2012). They have one daughter (Theadora Celeste Steil Torlot, born 2009).

References
TORLOT, Timothy Achille, Who's Who 2014, A & C Black, 2014; online edn, Oxford University Press, Dec 2013

1957 births
Living people
Alumni of Worcester College, Oxford
Members of HM Diplomatic Service
Ambassadors of the United Kingdom to Yemen
Ambassadors of the United Kingdom to Uzbekistan
20th-century British diplomats